This is a list of notable Chinese people living outside of the Republic of China and the People's Republic of China as well as non-Chinese people with known Chinese ancestry.

Leaders and politicians

Africa 
Jean Ping, President of the African Union, Gabon
Jean AhChuen, Minister, Mauritius
Mark Fok Seung, politician, Mauritius

Asia 
Corazon Aquino, former President, Philippines
Chiam See Tong, politician and 2nd longest-serving Opposition Leader, Singapore
Chong Kah Kiat, 13th Chief Minister of Sabah, Malaysia
Chung Keng Quee, Kapitan China of Perak & Penang, Malaysia
Chung Thye Phin, Kapitan China of Perak, Malaysia
Chung Kok Ming, Councillor of Federated Malay States, Malaysia
Arthur Chung, 1st President of Guyana, Guyana
Darmadi Durianto, politician, Indonesia
Fong Kui Lun, politician, Malaysia
Fong Po Kuan, politician, Malaysia
Goh Chok Tong, former Prime Minister, Singapore
Goh Keng Swee, former Deputy Prime Minister, Singapore
Han Bwee Kong, Kapitein der Chinezen, Indonesia
Heng Swee Keat, Deputy Prime Minister, Singapore
Hon Sui Sen, former cabinet minister, Singapore
Hun Sen, Prime Minister of Cambodia, Cambodia
Khaw Boon Wan, former cabinet minister, Singapore
Khouw Kim An, fifth Majoor der Chinezen ("Major of the Chinese") of Batavia, Indonesia
Khouw Tian Sek, Luitenant der Chinezen and patriarch of Khouw family of Tamboen, Indonesia
Khouw Tjeng Kee, Luitenant-titulair der Chinezen, Indonesia
Khouw Tjeng Po, Luitenant-titulair der Chinezen, Indonesia
Khouw Tjeng Tjoan, Luitenant-titulair der Chinezen, Indonesia
Khouw Yauw Kie, Kapitein der Chinezen and serve on the Chinese Council of Batavia, Indonesia
Koh Lay Huan – first Kapitan China of Penang, Malaysia
Koh Tsu Koon, former Chief Minister of Penang, Malaysia
Teresa Kok Suh Sim, politician, Malaysia
Kwik Kian Gie, former Economics and Finance Minister, Indonesia
Lee Bee Wah, politician, Singapore
Henry Lee Hau Shik, first Finance Minister of the Federation of Malaya, Malaysia
Lee Hsien Loong, Prime Minister, Singapore
Lee Kuan Yew, former Prime Minister, Singapore
Lee Lam Thye, politician, Malaysia
Lee Siew Choh, politician, Singapore
Leong Yew Koh – first Malacca Governor, Malaysia
Lie Tjoe Hong, 3rd Majoor der Chinezen of Batavia, Indonesia
Alvin Lie, politician, Indonesia
Alfredo Lim, former Senator, Philippines
Lim Chin Siong, politician, Singapore
Lim Chong Eu, former Chief Minister of Penang, Malaysia
Lim Guan Eng, former Chief Minister of Penang, Malaysia
Lim Keng Yaik, former cabinet minister, Malaysia
Lim Kim San, former cabinet minister, Singapore
Lim Kit Siang, politician, Malaysia
Lim Yew Hock, politician, Singapore
Ling How Doong, politician, Singapore
Mari Elka Pangestu, trade minister, Indonesia
Ne Win, former President of Burma, Myanmar
Low Thia Khiang, politician and longest-serving Opposition Leader, Singapore
Ong Ka Ting, former cabinet minister, Malaysia
Ong Pang Boon, former cabinet minister, Singapore
Ong Teng Cheong, 5th President of Singapore, Singapore
Ong Tiang Swee, Kapitan China of Sarawak, Malaysia
Jesse Robredo, politician, Philippines
Seah Tee Heng, 3rd Kapitan China of Johor, Malaysia
Seow Poh Leng, member of the committee in the Straits Settlement, Singapore
Thaksin Shinawatra, former Prime Minister, Thailand
Yingluck Shinawatra, former Prime Minister, Thailand
Tan Chee Khoon, politician, Malaysia
Tan Cheng Lock, founder and the first president of the Malayan Chinese Association (MCA), Malaysia
Tan Eng Goan, 1st Majoor der Chinezen of Batavia, Indonesia
Tan Kee Soon, first Kapitan China of Tebrau, Malaysia
Tony Tan Keng Yam, 7th President of Singapore, Singapore
Tan Kim Ching, Kapitan China, consul for Japan, Thailand and Russia, member of the Royal Court of Siam, Singapore
Tan Seng Giaw, politician, Malaysia
Tan Siew Sin, former Finance Minister, Malaysia
Tan Tjoen Tiat, 2nd Majoor der Chinezen of Batavia, Indonesia
Teo Chee Hean, former Deputy Prime Minister, Singapore
Tio Tek Ho, 4th Majoor der Chinezen of Batavia, Indonesia
Basuki Tjahaja Purnama (Tjung Ban Hok), former Governor of Jakarta, Indonesia
Banharn Silpa-Archa, former Prime Minister, Thailand
Chuan Leekpai, former Prime Minister, Thailand
Chamlong Srimuang, politician & founder of Phalang Dharma Party, Thailand
Somkid Jatusripitak, former finance minister, Thailand
Boonchu Rojanastien, former finance minister, Thailand
Anote Tong, President of Kiribati, Kiribati
Abhisit Vejjajiva, former Prime Minister, Thailand
Wee Kim Wee, 4th President of Singapore, Singapore
Yap Ah Loy, 3rd Kapitan China of Kuala Lumpur, Malaysia
Yap Ah Shak, 4th Kapitan China of Kuala Lumpur, Malaysia
Yap Kwan Seng, 5th Kapitan China of Kuala Lumpur, Malaysia

Australasia 
Jing Lee, politician, Australia
John So, Lord Mayor of Melbourne, Australia
Kenneth Wang, politician, New Zealand
Pansy Wong, former cabinet minister, New Zealand
Penny Wong, Senator, Australia

Europe 
Steven Dominique Cheung, Young Advisors for Her Majesty's Government and Youngest Candidates For European Parliament
Michael Chan, Baron Chan, physician and member of the House of Lords
Lydia Dunn, Baroness Dunn, deputy chairman and senior non-executive director of HSBC (since 1992)
Anna Lo, social worker and Alliance Party Member of the Legislative Assembly (MLA) of Northern Ireland

North America 
Elaine Chao, United States Secretary of Transportation
David S. C. Chu, Under Secretary of Defense for Readiness
 Jim Chu, Chief Constable of the Vancouver Police Department
Steven Chu, United States Secretary of Energy
Adrienne Clarkson, former Governor General of Canada
March Fong Eu, Secretary of State of California
Hiram L. Fong, former US Senator from Hawaii
Matthew K. Fong, former California State Treasurer
Edwin M. Lee, former city manager & mayor of San Francisco, California
John Liu, member of the New York City Council
Gary Locke, former governor of Washington
Shien Biau Woo, former attorney general and lieutenant governor of Delaware, current president of the 80-20 Initiative
David Wu, US Representative from Oregon; first and only Chinese American US Representative

Artists and performers

Actors and actresses
Gemma Chan

Jackie Chan, actor born in Hong Kong, works internationally, mainly in the United States
Nadine Chandrawinata, actress, Indonesia
Rosalind Chao, actress, United States
Maggie Cheung, actress born in Hong Kong, raised in the UK, works mainly in Hong Kong and Europe
Michelle Chong, actress, Singapore
Michael Chow Man-Kin, actor born in Canada, based in Hong Kong
Joe Taslim, actor, Indonesia
Kam Fong Chun, actor, United States
Alexa Chung, TV presenter, England
Heart Evangelista, actress, Philippines
Benson Fong, actor, United States
Jessica Henwick, actress, England
James Hong, actor, United States
Takeshi Kaneshiro, actor, Japan
Burt Kwouk, actor, born in England
Bruce Lee, actor and martial arts master born in San Francisco, worked in Hong Kong and the United States
Brandon Lee, actor born in Oakland, California; son of Bruce Lee
Shannon Lee, actress born in Los Angeles; daughter of Bruce Lee
Katie Leung, actress, Scotland
Baim Wong, actor, Indonesia
Lucy Liu, actress, born in New York City
Richard Loo, actor, United States
Keye Luke, actor, United States
Agnes Monica, actress, Indonesia
Olivia Munn, actress and TV presenter, United States
Haing S. Ngor, actor, born in Cambodia, worked in the United States
Harry Shum, Jr., actor, United States
Zoe Tay, actress, Singapore
Garrett Richard Wang, actor, United States
Benedict Wong, actor, United Kingdom
Fann Wong, actress, Singapore
Michelle Yeoh, actress, Malaysia
Victor Sen Yung, actor,  United States

Filmmakers
Lionel Chok, Singapore
Tze Chun, United States
Teguh Karya, born Steve Liem Tjoan Hok, Indonesia
Ang Lee, United States
James Lee, Malaysia
Tsai Ming-liang, Malaysia
Tan Chui Mui, Malaysia
Jack Neo, Singapore
Royston Tan, Singapore
James Wong, United States
James Wan, Australia

Musicians
Jin Au-Yeung, United States
Gary Cao, Malaysia
Jose Mari Chan, Philippines
Kit Chan, Singapore
Angelica Lee, Malaysia
Agnez Mo, Indonesia
Maia Lee, Singapore
Fish Leong, Malaysia
Imee Ooi, Malaysia
JJ Lin, Singapore
Eric Moo, Malaysia
Sylvester Sim, Singapore
Stefanie Sun, Singapore
Penny Tai, Malaysia
Vienna Teng, United States
Nicholas Teo, Malaysia
Yo Yo Ma, United States
Michael Wong, Malaysia
Titi DJ, Indonesia

Comedians
Raybon Kan, comedian, columnist, New Zealand

Video game designers
 Jenova Chen, United States

Voice actors
 Kaiji Tang, United States

Athletes
Michael Chang, tennis player, United States
Ang Peng Siong, swimmer, Singapore
Alan Budikusuma, badminton, Olympic gold medalist, Indonesia
Chan Chong Ming, badminton player, Malaysia
Chew Choon Eng, badminton player, Malaysia
Choong Tan Fook, badminton player, Malaysia
Rudy Hartono, badminton legend, Indonesia
Pi Hongyan, badminton player, France
Goh Tat Chuan, footballer, Singapore
He Zhi Wen, table tennis, Spain
Jeremy Lin, NBA basketball player, United States
Lee Chong Wei, badminton player, Malaysia
Lee Wan Wah, badminton player, Malaysia
Li Jiawei, table tennis player, Singapore
Li Li, badminton player, Singapore
Liem Swie King, badminton legend, Indonesia
Lim Eng Beng, basketball player, Philippines
Samboy Lim, basketball player, Philippines
Wong Mew Choo, badminton player, Malaysia
Ng Ser Miang, sailor, Singapore
Sadaharu Oh, baseball player, Japan
Remy Ong, bowling player, Singapore
Poh Seng Song, athlete, Singapore
Susi Susanti, badminton, Olympic gold medalist, Indonesia
Ho-Pin Tung, race driver, Netherlands
Xu Huaiwen, athlete, Germany
Jiang Yanmei, badminton player, Singapore
Jing Jun Hong, table tennis player, Singapore
Wong Choong Hann, badminton player Malaysia
Yao Jie, badminton player, Netherlands
Alex Yoong, race driver, Malaysia
Li Donghua, gymnastics, Switzerland
Michelle Kwan, figure skater, United States
Patrick Chan, figure skater, Canada
Jeremy Ten, figure skater, Canada
Beatrisa Liang, figure skater, United States
Caroline Zhang, figure skater, United States
Tiffany Chin, figure skater, United States
Christina Gao, figure skater, United States
Nathan Chen, figure skater, United States
Karen Chen, figure skater, United States
Vincent Zhou, figure skater, United States
Shaoang Liu, speed skater, Hungary
Shaolin Sándor Liu, speed skater, Hungary
Emma Raducanu

Businesspeople
Tan Kah Kee, Entrepreneur, Singapore
Lee Kong Chian, Entrepreneur, Singapore
Lee Choon Seng, Entrepreneur, Singapore
Khoo Teck Puat, Entrepreneur, Singapore
Lim Goh Tong, Entrepreneur, Malaysia
Lim Kok Thay, Malaysia
Sudono Salim (Liem Sioe Liong), Entrepreneur, Indonesia
Anthoni Salim (Liem Hong Sien), Indonesia
Chin Sophonpanich, Entrepreneur, Thailand
Chatri Sophonpanich, Thailand
Chartsiri Sophonpanich, Thailand
Choti Lamsam, Entrepreneur, Thailand
Banthoon Lamsam, Thailand
Chaleo Yoovidhya, Entrepreneur, Thailand
Chalerm Yoovidhya, Thailand
Dhanin Chearavanont (Chia Kok Min), Thailand
Suphachai Chearavanont, Thailand
Korawad Chearavanont, Thailand
Jeffrey Cheah, Malaysia
William Cheng, Malaysia
Jimmy Choo, Malaysia
Robert Kuok, Entrepreneur, Malaysia
Lucio Tan, Entrepreneur, Philippines
Wee Cho Yaw, Singapore
Wee Ee Cheong, Singapore
Lien Ying Chow, Singapore
Kwek Leng Beng, Singapore
Eduardo "Danding" Cojuangco Jr., Philippines
Olivia Lum, Singapore
Quek Leng Chan, Malaysia
Low Kiok Chiang, Singapore
John Gokongwei, Philippines
Seow Poh Leng, Singapore
Henry Sy, Philippines
Vincent Tan, Malaysia
Tan Kim Ching, Singapore, Thailand, Malaysia
Teh Hong Piow, Malaysia
Tiong Hiew King, Malaysia
Lilian Too, Malaysia
George Ty, Philippines
Francis Yeoh, Malaysia
Rebekah Yeoh, Malaysia
Ruth Yeoh, Malaysia
Yeoh Tiong Lay, Malaysia
Tony Tan Caktiong, Philippines
Jerry Yang, United States
Alfonso Yuchengco, Philippines
Loh Boon Siew, Malaysia
Sondhi Limthongkul, Thailand

Law
Chan Sek Keong, 3rd Chief Justice, Singapore
Chang Min Tat, Federal court judge, Malaysia
Mai Chen, constitutional lawyer, New Zealand
Denny Chin, District Judge, United States
Kwa Geok Choo, Singapore
Ong Hock Thye, Chief Judge, Malaysia
Woon Cheong Ming Walter, Singapore
Wee Chong Jin, 1st Chief Justice, Singapore
Albino SyCip, banker and lawyer, Philippines
Tan Boon Teik, Attorney-General, Singapore
Thomas Tang, Federal Judge, United States
Claudio Teehankee, Chief Justice, Philippines
Pedro Yap, Chief Justice, Philippines
Yong Pung How, 2nd Chief Justice, Singapore

Military officers and soldiers
General Vicente Lim, Philippines
Rear Admiral John Lie Tjeng Tjoan, Indonesia
Brigadier General Teddy Jusuf (Him Tek Ji), Indonesia
Lieutenant General Winston Choo Wee Leong, Singapore
Captain Francis B. Wai, United States
 Albert Kwok Fen Nam, war hero and leader of the "Kinabalu Guerrillas" against Japanese occupation, Malaysia
James Yee, military chaplain, United States

Religious leaders
Buddhādasa Bhikkhu, Prominent Buddhist Reformer, Thailand
Somdet Kiaw, Acting Supreme Patriarch of Thailand and abbot of Wat Saket, Thailand
Prayudh Payutto, Well-known intellectual monk and prolific writer, Thailand
Venerable Prof. KL Dhammajoti, Well-known Buddhist scholar, Malaysia
Sayadaw U Tejaniya, Theravādin Buddhist monk and famous meditation teacher, Myanmar
Ashin Jinarakkhita, Key figure in the Revival of Indonesian Buddhism, Indonesia
Venerable Zhuan Dao, Founder of the KMSPKS and Buddhist leader, Singapore
Venerable Hong Choon, 2nd president of SBF and Buddhist leader, Singapore
Venerable Long Gen, 7th president of SBF and Buddhist leader, Singapore
Jakusho Kwong – Zen Buddhist Master of Shunryu Suzuki lineage and founder of Sonoma Mountain Zen Center, United States
Venerable Chi Chern, Chan Master of Sheng Yen lineage and principal of the Malaysian Buddhist Institute, Malaysia
Moy Lin-shin, Taoist monk and founder of Fung Loy Kok Institute of Taoism, Canada
Chow Yam-nam (白龍王), well-known guru and has been known as a "living saint", Thailand
 Bhante Sujiva – well-known teacher of Vipassana in the Theravāda Buddhist Tradition
Jaime Sin, Roman Catholic Cardinal Archbishop, Philippines
Stephen Tong,  Indonesian Reformed Evangelist, Indonesia
Hussein Ye, Islamic preacher and scholar, Malaysia
Jimmy Yu (Guo Gu), Chan teacher of Sheng Yen lineage, Associate Professor of Religion at Florida State University and founder of Tallahassee Chan Center, United States

Seamen
Lim Poon BEM, shipwreck survivor

Writers, poets and artists

Asia 
Aaron Lee, Singapore
Russell Lee, Singapore
Catherine Lim, Singapore
Shirley Geok-lin Lim, Malaysia
Su-Chen Christine Lim, Singapore
Tan Swie Hian, Singapore

Australasia 
Jack Yan, publisher, author, New Zealand
Grace Chin, columnist, Malaysia

Europe 
François Cheng, writer, France
Gao Xingjian, writer, France
Jung Chang, author, United Kingdom
Timothy Mo, author, United Kingdom
Helen Tse, author, United Kingdom
Xiaolu Guo, author, United Kingdom
Tash Aw, writer, United Kingdom

United States
Amy Chua, author and professor of law
Gish Jen, author
Ha Jin, author
Jean Kwok, author
Laura Ling, journalist
Lisa Ling, journalist
Amy Tan, author
Helen Zia, journalist

Scientists, engineers, medicine
Min Chueh Chang, reproductive biologist, United States
Victor Chang, surgeon, Australia
Steven Chu, scientist, 1997 Nobel Prize winner in Physics, United States
Kevin Fong, space physiologist, United Kingdom
David Ho, AIDS researcher, United States
Wen Ho Lee, scientist, United States
Ken Yeang, architect, Malaysia
Chang-Lin Tien, engineer and previous Chancellor of UC Berkeley, United States
Chern Shiing-shen, mathematician, United States
Da-Wen Sun, engineer, Ireland
Terence Tao, mathematician, Fields Medal winner, Australia
Shing-Tung Yau, mathematician, Fields Medal winner, United States
An Wang, computer engineer, United States
Kai-Fu Lee, computer scientist, United States

Art, design, culinary
Amber Chia, international model, Malaysia
Jimmy Choo, designer, Malaysia
Chen Kenichi, chef, Japan
Ming Tsai, chef, United States
Ling Tan, model, Malaysia
Vivienne Tam, fashion designer, United States
Zang Toi, fashion designer, Malaysia
Ang Kiukok, artist, Philippines
Susur Lee, chef/restaurateur, originally from British Hong Kong, based in Toronto, Canada
Maya Lin, artist and architect, United States
Justin Quek, chef, Singapore
John Clang / John C.L. Ang, photographer, Singapore
Zao Wou Ki, painter, France
I. M. Pei, architect, United States
Alexander Wang, fashion designer, United States
Poh Ling Yeow, celebrity chef, Australia
Michelle Yeoh, fashion influencer, United Kingdom
Rachel Yeoh, fashion influencer, United Kingdom

References

See also 
 List of Chinese people
 List of Chinese Americans
 List of Chinese Australians
 List of Chinese British
 List of Chinese Canadians
 List of Chinese Filipinos
 List of Malaysian Chinese
 List of Chinese New Zealanders
 Overseas Chinese
 Chinese Singaporean
 Chinese Thai
 Chinese Indonesian
 List of Hokkien people
 List of Cantonese people
 List of politicians of Chinese descent

 
Chinese
Overseas